is a sub-kilometer binary asteroid, classified as a near-Earth asteroid and potentially hazardous object of the Apollo group. Radar observations of the asteroid were carried out by the Arecibo Observatory on 4 February 2020, revealing a natural satellite orbiting  from the primary body.

Discovery 
 was discovered on 27 January 2020 by the Asteroid Terrestrial-impact Last Alert System (ATLAS) survey at the Mauna Loa Observatory in Hawaii. The ATLAS survey was designed for detecting near-Earth asteroids on approach to Earth, particularly those that may be considered potentially hazardous under circumstances where they can approach Earth from close distances.  was identified by a team of astronomers consisting of Larry Denneau, John Tonry, Aren Heinze, and Henry Weiland, who were chiefly involved in the ATLAS project. At the time of discovery,  was located in the constellation of Puppis at an apparent magnitude of 17.6.

Follow-up observations of  spanned three days since its discovery, and the asteroid was formally announced in a Minor Planet Electronic Circular issued by the Minor Planet Center on 30 January 2020.

Nomenclature 
Upon discovery, the asteroid was given the temporary internal designation A10jUnf. After follow up observations confirming the object, it was then given the provisional designation  by the Minor Planet Center on 30 January 2020. The provisional designation signifies the object's discovery date and year. Although  has a sufficiently long observation arc for its orbit to be accurately determined, the asteroid has not yet been issued a permanent minor planet number by the Minor Planet Center.

Orbit and classification 
As it approaches perihelion,  moves above the ecliptic and comes closer to the Sun than Venus, whereas at aphelion,  moves below the ecliptic and recedes from the Sun farther out than the orbit of Mars. The orbit of  crosses that of Earth's, thus it can occasionally make close approaches to the planet, making it a near-Earth object. With a semi-major axis (average orbit distance) greater than 1 AU and a perihelion distance within that of Earth's,  is formally classified under the Apollo group of near-Earth asteroids.

Having such a small Earth MOID,  is considered a potentially hazardous asteroid (PHA) by the Minor Planet Center, under the definition that PHAs have Earth MOIDs less than 0.05 AU and absolute magnitudes under 22.

On 12 February 2020, a team of astronomers identified  in several precovery images taken by the Pan-STARRS 1 survey, with the earliest images dating back to 5 January 2014. The observation arc of these precovery images spanned over six years, long enough for astronomers to refine and calculate 's orbit with accuracy. This greatly reduced uncertainties in the asteroid's orbit, reducing its uncertainty parameter from 8 to 1.  the observation arc of  spans 6.09 years or 2,224 days, with an orbit uncertainty parameter of 0 according to the JPL Small-Body Database.

2020 Earth approach 
On 3 February 2020 at 18:56 UTC,  passed , or 11.35 lunar distances, from Earth. At closest approach the asteroid's apparent motion in the sky was 1.2 degrees per hour and was in the constellation of Cetus, at an apparent magnitude of 16 and an angular separation of 20 degrees from the Moon.

The February 2020 encounter by  provided an opportunity for radar observatories to study the asteroid's characteristics in detail.  was the first radar target observed by the Arecibo Observatory in Puerto Rico since the one-month shutdown of observatory operations due to a series of earthquakes that have occurred in the southern region of Puerto Rico during December 2019 and January 2020. Over a two-day observation period, astronomers measured the asteroid's size, shape, and rotation, along with the discovery of a small orbiting satellite.

After the February 2020 encounter,  passed perihelion on 21 March 2020.

Future approaches 
Over the course of its orbit in the next 200 years,  will continue to pass by Earth, though it will not make any approaches as close as the February 2020 encounter that would otherwise warrant attention. The next two Earth encounters by  will occur in February 2022 and 2024, with approach distances of 0.18 AU and 0.34 AU, respectively.

Physical characteristics 
In Arecibo delay-Doppler radar observations from 4 January to 5 January 2020,  was resolved at a resolution of 7.5 meters per pixel, allowing for direct measurements of the asteroid's physical properties. The rotation of  has not been fully observed in detail due to radar projection effects, thus only constraints on its rotation period can be made.

Satellite 

Under satellite naming conventions by the International Astronomical Union, the satellite would be provisionally designated . The satellite may have formed as a result of rotational fission or mass ejection of the primary body, since  along with other binary near-Earth asteroids have been observed to have rapid rotation periods and spheroidal shapes.

Physical characteristics 
The magnitude difference between the satellite and primary is about 1.9, implying an absolute magnitude of about 22.5 for the satellite, given an absolute magnitude of 20.6 for the primary.

Orbit and rotation 
However, another possible orbital period of  has not been yet been ruled out, due to projection effects of radar images. Radar observations by Arecibo suggest the satellite is likely tidally locked to the primary body, with its rotation period being synchronous with its orbital period. However, uncertainties remain in measurements of the satellite's rotation period, thus an upper limit to its period was placed at 49 hours.

Notes

References

External links 

 Arecibo Observatory Discovers Moon Orbiting Near-Earth Asteroid, Tracy Becker, University of Central Florida, 12 Feb 2020
 An Asteroid Totally Just Mooned Earth, Michelle Starr, ScienceAlert, 11 Feb 2020
 Discovery Announcement of Binary System 2020 BX12, Planetary Radar Science Group, 10 Feb 2020
 2020BX12 – Summary, ESA Space Situational Awareness, 10 Feb 2020
 
 

Minor planet object articles (unnumbered)
Discoveries by ATLAS

20200127
20200127